Ionel I.V. Săndulescu is a Romanian politician who stems from the National Liberal Party (PNL) and was previously elected senator in the Romanian Senate in the 1990–1992 legislature. He was one of the 12 re-founding members of the National Liberal Party (PNL) back in early 1990, alongside other former historical PNL members such as Radu Câmpeanu, Sorin Bottez, or Nicolae Enescu.

References 

National Liberal Party (Romania) politicians
Members of the Senate of Romania
Living people

Year of birth missing (living people)